Timothy or Tim or Timmy Hill may refer to:

 Tim Hill (politician) (b. 1936), American politician in Washington state
 Tim Hill (director) (b. 1958), American screenwriter and film director
 Tim Hill (basketball) (b. 1976), American basketball player
 Timothy Hill (politician) (b. 1981), former member of the Tennessee House of Representatives.
 Tim Hill (baseball) (b. 1990), American baseball player
 Timmy Hill (b. 1993), American racing driver

See also 
 Captain Timothy Hill House